Roberto Sighel (born 17 February 1967) is an Italian former speedskater, with particularly strong achievements in the allround samalogue competitions.

Sighel was born in Trento.  His skating career was unusually long, competing at top international level from 1988 to 2002. He participated in each of the 1988, 1992, 1994, 1998, 2002 Olympics, with 7th place his best result (10,000-m 1988, 5000-m 2002).

Sighel won the 1992 World Allround Championships, where he set a world record with 157.150 (37.38, 6:43,91, 1:52,38, 13:58,39).

In the World Allround Championships series, his results were 23 (1987), 6 (1988), 15 (1989), 2 (1991), 1 (1992), 6 (1993), 13 (1994), 3 (1995), 13 (1996), 22 (1997), 3 (1998), 4 (1999), 19 (2001), 7 (2002).

Adelskalender 
Very few skaters manage to stay within the top ten of the Adelskalender over several seasons. Sighel is among those few, as he was
 no. 14 after the 1989 season,
 no. 15 after 1990,
 no. 9 after 1991,
 no. 2 after 1992,
 no. 3 after 1993,
 no. 4 after 1994,
 no. 4 after 1995,
 no. 5 after 1996,
 no. 7 after 1997,
 no. 3 after 1998,
 no. 3 after 1999,
 no. 5 after 2000,
 no. 13 after 2001,
 and no. 10 at career finish at 2002.

Records

Personal records 

Source: SpeedskatingResults.com

World record 

Source: SpeedSkatingStats.com

References

External links 
 Roberto Sighel at SpeedSkatingStats.com
 World records one hour skating

1967 births
Living people
Italian male speed skaters
Olympic speed skaters of Italy
Speed skaters at the 1988 Winter Olympics
Speed skaters at the 1992 Winter Olympics
Speed skaters at the 1994 Winter Olympics
Speed skaters at the 1998 Winter Olympics
Speed skaters at the 2002 Winter Olympics
Sportspeople from Trento
World Allround Speed Skating Championships medalists
20th-century Italian people
21st-century Italian people